The Women's sprint competition at the 2019 UCI Track Cycling World Championships was held on 28 February and 1 March 2019.

Results

Qualifying
The qualifying was started on 28 February at 14:53. The top four riders advanced directly to the 1/8 finals; places 5 to 28 advanced to the 1/16 final.

1/16 finals
The 1/16 finals were started on 28 February at 15:58. Heat winners advanced to the 1/8 finals.

1/8 finals
The 1/8 finals were started on 28 February at 16:50. Heat winners advanced to the quarterfinals.

Quarterfinals
The quarterfinals were started 28 February at 18:58. Matches were extended to a best-of-three format hereon; winners proceeded to the semifinals.

Semifinals
The semifinals were started on 1 March at 19:22.

Finals
The finals were started on 1 March at 20:47.

References

Women's sprint
2019